David Athelstane Fall (December 4, 1902 – November 9, 1964) was an American diver who competed in the 1924 Summer Olympics. He was born in Fairland, Oklahoma and died in San Bernardino, California.

Fall competed collegiately for Oregon State University and Stanford University. In 1924 he won the silver medal in the 10 metre platform competition.

References

External links
profile

1902 births
1964 deaths
Divers at the 1924 Summer Olympics
Olympic silver medalists for the United States in diving
Stanford Cardinal men's divers
Oregon State Beavers men's divers
American male divers
People from Fairland, Oklahoma
Medalists at the 1924 Summer Olympics